Konstantin Gennadyevich Nizhegorodov (born 21 June 2002) is a Russian football player. He plays as a centre-back for FC Rubin Kazan.

Club career
On 11 June 2021, he signed with Russian Premier League club FC Rubin Kazan. He made his debut in the RPL for Rubin on 13 September 2021 in a game against FC Ural Yekaterinburg.

Personal life
His father Gennadiy Nizhegorodov is a former Russian international footballer.
His mother is the sister of the wife of footballer Ilya Tsymbalar.

Career statistics

References

External links
 
 
 

2002 births
Footballers from Moscow
Living people
Russian footballers
Association football defenders
FC Rubin Kazan players
Russian Premier League players
Russian First League players
Russian expatriate footballers
Expatriate footballers in Germany
Russian expatriate sportspeople in Germany